The Brainerd Micropolitan Statistical Area, as defined by the United States Census Bureau, is an area consisting of Cass County and Crow Wing County in Northern Minnesota, anchored by the city of Brainerd. As of February 4, 2011 estimate placed the population at 91,067.

Counties
Cass
Crow Wing

Communities
Places with more than 10,000 inhabitants
Brainerd (Principal city)
Places with 1,000 to 10,000 inhabitants
Baxter
Breezy Point
Crosby
Crosslake
East Gull Lake
Lake Shore
Nisswa
Pequot Lakes
Pine River
Walker
Places with 500 to 1,000 inhabitants
Cass Lake
Deerwood
Emily
Ironton
Motley (partial)
Places with fewer than 500 inhabitants
Backus
Bena
Boy River
Chickamaw Beach
Cuyuna
Federal Dam
Fifty Lakes
Fort Ripley
Garrison
Hackensack
Jenkins
Longville
Manhattan Beach
Pillager
Remer
Riverton
Trommald
Unorganized territories
Dean Lake
West Crow Wing
Wahnena
North Cass
North Central Cass
East Cass
Unincorporated places
Outing
Pontoria
Census-designated place
Merrifield

Townships

Cass County

Crow Wing County

Demographics
As of the census of 2000, there were 82,249 people, 33,143 households, and 22,908 families residing within the μSA. The racial makeup of the μSA was 93.97% White, 0.24% African American, 4.30% Native American, 0.28% Asian, 0.02% Pacific Islander, 0.18% from other races, and 1.01% from two or more races. Hispanic or Latino of any race were 0.73% of the population.

The median income for a household in the μSA was $35,961, and the median income for a family was $42,502. Males had a median income of $31,968 versus $22,064 for females. The per capita income for the μSA was $18,182.

See also
List of Micropolitan Statistical Areas by state
Minnesota statistical areas

References

 
Geography of Crow Wing County, Minnesota
Geography of Cass County, Minnesota